Tyler Ray Olson (born October 2, 1989) is an American professional baseball pitcher who is a free agent. He has played in Major League Baseball (MLB) for the Seattle Mariners, New York Yankees, and Cleveland Indians.

Amateur career
Olson attended University High School in Spokane Valley, Washington. He enrolled at Gonzaga University and pitched for the Gonzaga Bulldogs baseball team. He pitched for the Bulldogs as a freshman in 2009, but took a redshirt in 2010 when he suffered a shoulder subluxation. In 2012, his junior year, he was added to the Bulldogs' starting rotation, and pitched 110 innings.

The Oakland Athletics selected Olson in the 17th round of the 2012 Major League Baseball draft. Olson did not sign with Oakland, returning to Gonzaga for his senior year. As a senior, Olson had a 9-4 win–loss record and a 2.48 earned run average (ERA) in  innings pitched. He was named the West Coast Conference's Pitcher of the Year.

Professional career

Seattle Mariners
The Seattle Mariners selected Olson in the seventh round, with the 207th overall selection, of the 2013 MLB Draft. He signed with the Mariners and began his professional career with the Everett AquaSox of the Class A-Short Season Northwest League. He started the 2014 season with the High Desert Mavericks of the Class A-Advanced California League, and was promoted to the Jackson Generals of the Class AA Southern League during the season.

The Mariners invited Olson to spring training in 2015. He made the Mariners' Opening Day roster. He made his Major League debut on April 7, 2015 and worked extremely efficiently, throwing only one pitch and getting two outs on a ground ball double play. He went on the disabled list with a knee injury in May. He was activated and optioned to the Tacoma Rainiers of the Class AAA Pacific Coast League (PCL) on June 2. Olson finished the 2015 season with a 1–1 win–loss record and a 5.40 ERA in 11 relief appearances for the Mariners.

Los Angeles Dodgers
Olson was traded to the Los Angeles Dodgers for cash considerations on December 18, 2015, but was designated for assignment by the Dodgers on January 6, 2016.

New York Yankees
On January 12, the Dodgers traded Olson and infielder Ronald Torreyes to the New York Yankees in exchange for minor leaguer Rob Segedin and a player to be named later or cash. He began the 2016 season with the Scranton/Wilkes-Barre RailRiders of the Class AAA International League, and was promoted to the major leagues on April 15. The Yankees designated Olson for assignment on June 7.

Kansas City Royals
The Kansas City Royals claimed Olson off of waivers and optioned him to the Omaha Storm Chasers of the PCL.

Cleveland Indians
The Cleveland Indians claimed him off waivers from the Royals on July 9, and assigned him to the Columbus Clippers of the International League. The Indians designated him for assignment on August 4. On August 14, 2016, he was sent outright to Columbus.

Olson began the 2017 season with Columbus. The Indians purchased his contract on July 21, 2017, and he faced one batter against the Toronto Blue Jays that night. Olson remained on the Indians for the rest of the year. He appeared in 30 games, pitching 20 innings without giving up an earned run. He made the Indians' postseason roster and pitched in the postseason for the first time, appearing in 3 games without giving up an earned run.

Olson made the 2018 Indians Opening Day roster. On May 11, he was placed on the paternity list as he went to be with his wife Shayna for the birth of their first child. Olson finished the season with 43 appearances, logging in  innings. In 2019, Olson pitched in  innings, going 1-1 in 39 games. Following the 2019 season, Olson was outrighted off the Indians roster and became a free agent.

Chicago Cubs
On January 17, 2020, Olson signed a minor league deal with the Chicago Cubs. He became a free agent on November 2, 2020.

Boston Red Sox
On April 6, 2021, Olson signed a minor league contract with the Boston Red Sox organization. He was assigned to the Double-A Portland Sea Dogs. He elected free agency on November 7, 2021.

Personal
Olson and his wife Shayna welcomed their first child, a son, in May 2018.

Olson grew up a Seattle Mariners fan.

References

External links

1989 births
Living people
Baseball players from Spokane, Washington
Major League Baseball pitchers
Seattle Mariners players
New York Yankees players
Cleveland Indians players
Gonzaga Bulldogs baseball players
Everett AquaSox players
High Desert Mavericks players
Jackson Generals (Southern League) players
Tacoma Rainiers players
Scranton/Wilkes-Barre RailRiders players
Omaha Storm Chasers players
Columbus Clippers players
Portland Sea Dogs players